The 1937 San Diego Padres season, was the second season for the original San Diego Padres baseball team of the Pacific Coast League (PCL). The team began in 1903 as the Sacramento Solons, a charter member of the PCL. The team moved several times and were the Hollywood Stars from 1926 to 1935. Team owner Bill Lane moved the team from Hollywood to San Diego in 1936. The 1937 Padres won the PCL pennant after defeating Sacramento Solons and the Portland Beavers in post-season series.

Season overview
The 1937 PCL season ran from April 2 to September 19, 1937. The Padres, led by manager Frank Shellenback, finished third in the PCL with a 97–81 record. The Padres qualified for the PCL's four-team playoffs. They defeated the first-place Sacramento Solons, four games to none, in the opening round, and then defeated the second-place Portland Beavers in the championship series, again by four games to zero.

Ted Williams, age 18 when the season began, played in left field for the 1937 Padres, compiling a .291 batting average with 23 home runs in 138 games. On December 7, 1937, the Padres dealt Williams, described in the next day's The Boston Globe as "a string-bean 19-year-old outfielder from San Diego", to the Boston Red Sox in exchange for cash plus outfielder Dom D'Allessandro and infielder Al Niemiec. In 1999, Williams was ranked as number eight on The Sporting News''' list of the 100 Greatest Baseball Players, where he was the highest-ranking left fielder.

Catcher George Detore won the 1937 PCL batting crown with a .334 batting average. Five other Padres also finished the 1937 season with batting averages higher than Williams: right fielder Rupe Thompson (.326), second baseman Jimmie Reese (.314), first baseman George McDonald (.312), center fielder Hal Patchett (.306), and outfielder Cedric Durst (.293).

San Diego's outfielders also ranked as the league's best defensively. Center fielder Hal Patchett led the PCL (all positions) with a .993 fielding percentage, committing only three errors with 442 putouts and five assists. Right fielder Rupe Thompson led the league's outfielders with 27 assists.

The Padres' pitching staff was led by Tiny Chaplin who appeared in 43 games and compiled a 23–15 win–loss record with a 2.72 earned run average (ERA).  Manny Salvo compiled a 19–13 record and led the PCL with 196 strikeouts.

1937 PCL standings

 Statistics 

 Batting Note: Pos = Position; G = Games played; AB = At bats; H = Hits; Avg. = Batting average; HR = Home runs; SLG = Slugging percentage; RBI = Runs batted in; SB = Stolen bases Pitching Note: G = Games pitched; IP = Innings pitched; W = Wins; L = Losses; PCT = Win percentage; ERA = Earned run average; SO = Strikeouts''

References

Further reading
 "The Greatest Minor League: A History of the Pacific Coast League, 1903-1957", by Dennis Snelling (McFarland 2011)

1937 in sports in California
Pacific Coast League seasons